Chak no 145 JB Salaray is a Pakistani village located near Aminpur, a small city in the Chiniot District, Pakistan. The primary industry of the area is agriculture. The main tribes of Salaray are Salara, Chishti, and Warbho. Salaray village covers an area of 40 murabas (1000 acres), and it has been noted that the area has a very low literacy rate.

Villages in Chiniot District